

593001–593100 

|-bgcolor=#f2f2f2
| colspan=4 align=center | 
|}

593101–593200 

|-id=195
| 593195 Lavinaahmed ||  || Lavina Ahmed (1983–2020) was a Bangladeshi-Swedish scientist and cancer researcher who focused on the AXL receptor tyrosine kinase. || 
|}

593201–593300 

|-bgcolor=#f2f2f2
| colspan=4 align=center | 
|}

593301–593400 

|-bgcolor=#f2f2f2
| colspan=4 align=center | 
|}

593401–593500 

|-bgcolor=#f2f2f2
| colspan=4 align=center | 
|}

593501–593600 

|-bgcolor=#f2f2f2
| colspan=4 align=center | 
|}

593601–593700 

|-bgcolor=#f2f2f2
| colspan=4 align=center | 
|}

593701–593800 

|-bgcolor=#f2f2f2
| colspan=4 align=center | 
|}

593801–593900 

|-bgcolor=#f2f2f2
| colspan=4 align=center | 
|}

593901–594000 

|-bgcolor=#f2f2f2
| colspan=4 align=center | 
|}

References 

593001-594000